A wood shaper, usually just shaper in North America or spindle moulder in the UK and Europe, is a stationary woodworking machine in which a vertically oriented spindle drives cutter heads to mill profiles on wood stock. 
The wood being fed into a moulder is commonly referred to as either stock or blanks. The spindle may be raised and lowered relative to the shaper's table, and rotates between 3,000 and 10,000 rpm, with stock running along a vertical fence.

Wood shaper cutter heads typically have three blades, and turn at one-half to one-eighth the speed of smaller, much less expensive two-bladed bits used on a hand-held wood router.  Adapters are sold allowing a shaper to drive router bits, a compromise on several levels.  As are router tables, cost-saving adaptations of hand-held routers mounted to comparatively light-duty dedicated work tables.

Being both larger and much more powerful than routers, shapers can cut much larger profiles than routerssuch as for crown moulding and raised-panel doorsand readily drive custom-made bits fabricated with unique profiles.  Shapers feature between  belt-driven motors, which run much more quietly and smoothly than typically 20,000 to 25,000 rpm direct-drive routers. Speed adjustments are typically made by relocating the belts on a stepped pulley system, much like that on a drill press. Unlike routers, shapers are also able to run in reverse, which is necessary in performing some cuts.

The most common form of wood shaper has a vertical spindle; some have horizontal; others yet have spindles or tables that tilt.  Some European models variously combine sliding tablesaws, jointers, planers, and mortisers.

Shapers can be adapted to perform specialized cuts employing accessories such as sliding tables, tenon tables, tilting arbor, tenoning hoods, and interchangeable spindles. Most spindles are tall enough to accommodate more than one cutter head, allowing rapid tooling changes by raising or lowering desired heads into position. Additional spindles can be fitted with pre-spaced cutter heads when more are needed for a job than fit on one.

A wood moulder differs from a shaper, which typically has one  vertical cutting head and none horizontal. The term "tooling" refers to a moulder's cutters, knives, blades including planer blades, and cutterheads.

Safety
The primary safety feature on a wood shaper is a guard mounted above the cutter protecting hands and garments from being drawn into its blades. Jigs, fixtures such as hold-downs, and accessories that include featherboards, also help prevent injury and generally result in better cuts. The starter, or fulcrum, pin is a metal rod which threads into the table a few inches away from the cutter allowing stock to be fed into it in a freehand cut.

In addition to aiding productivity and setting a consistent rate of milling, a power feeder keeps appendages and garments out of harm's way.  They may be multi-speed, and employ rubber wheels to feed stock past the cutter head.

Types
Before machines, men worked as "moulders" shaping wood by hand.
Single head moulders:
Single head moulders have a top (horizontal) head only.
Single head moulders are more economical but they also feed through slower than multi head moulders and, as the name implies, a *single head moulder will only cut one surface at a time.

Multi Head Moulder:
Standing from in front of the infeed side of the machine where the stock is fed into the machine. A common cutter head configuration is;

Bottom horizontal head, a right hand vertical side head, a Left hand vertical side head, and a top horizontal head.

This is a common configuration (in order of layout), but there are countless other configurations available. For instance; a multi head moulder may have two bottom heads and two top heads in order to size the lumber with the first top and the first bottom head, and then finish cut the lumber with the remaining top and bottom head.

Machines with two or more right heads more common in the furniture industry to give the ability to run shorter stock and more detailed, deeper cuts on the edge of the stock.

Tooling
Tooling refers to cutters, knives, blades, as well as planer blades, and cutter heads.
Most blades are made from either a type of tool steel known as high speed steel (HSS), or from carbide. Cutter heads are normally made from either steel or aluminum.

High Speed Steel, carbide, aluminium, and steel for the cutter heads all come in a wide variety of grades.

References

Bibliography
 
 Welcome to the Architectural Woodwork Institute

Shaper